Manaro Voui, or Manaro Vui, is a shield volcano whose emergent portion is known as the island of Ambae in Vanuatu. According to  indigenous custom Chief Virenaliu Paul Vuhu, the summit's valley and lakes are considered `the "sacred place and paradise" where they believe after death, their spirits go to live happily ever after'. Vanuatu Meteorology and Geohazards Department maintains a live webcam and seismological chart.

Name 
Volcanologists use the term 'volcano' to refer to either a "vent in the surface of the Earth through which magma and associated gases and ash erupt", or "the form or structure (usually conical) that is produced by the ejected material."

Aoba is the name of the volcano used on Volcano World in their world database in their list of Vanuatu's 9 volcanoes. Manaro is the name they use to refer to the summit crater, which contains multiple vents and lakes.

Aoba is also the name used by Smithsonian Institution's Global Volcanism Program in their list of 14 volcanos on Vanuatu. Manaro Ngoru and Lake Voui are the names they use for the summit craters. In a 2005 report, The Bulletin of the Global Volcanism Network stated that Aoba is "referred to locally as Manaro or Lombenben"

Aoba is also the name used in The World Factbook written by US Central Intelligence Agency.

Aoba is also the name used in a 2017 peer reviewed article in the journal Science, whose lead author works at NASA, and holds a joint appointment at the University of California Los Angeles.

Lombenben is the name used on a 2017 map published by Vanuatu's National Disaster Management Office.

Lombenben is also the name used by the daily newspaper Vanuatu Daily Post
in recent articles.

Manaro Voui is the name used in various articles in 2017 by Vanuatu Digest, Reuters, Associated Press and Radio New Zealand.

Manaro is the name used in Encyclopædia Britannica in their entry on Aoba.

Manaro is also the name used in 2017 articles in Vanuatu Daily Post and The Guardian for the volcano (cinder cone) in the middle of the lake on top of Mount Lombenben.

Volcanic activity 
The mountain is one of the most dangerously active volcanoes in the world; its last eruption was recorded in 2017.  Previously, up to 5,000 people living near the volcano have had to be evacuated for their safety.

The volcano's recent history includes eruptions in 1966, 2005 and 2016.

September 2017 Eruptions

2018 eruption

After residents were allowed to return to Ambae Island, Manaro Voui once again began erupting with heavy ashfalls on the island in late March 2018; Volcanic Alert Level 3 was instituted on 19 March. The ashfalls were severe enough, but coupled with rains, made the ash heavy and wet enough that roofs collapsed and even tree limbs were brought down by the weight of the heavy, wet ash. By April, around 750 residents out of 13,000 had been rendered homeless by the volcanic ash and landslides, and Vanuatu government declared a mandatory evacuation, which was met with resistance. The ashfall decreased over the following months, but the eruption picked up again in July. 16 July saw a heavy ashfall, prompting people to use umbrellas and turn on artificial lighting in late afternoon. All schools on Ambae were closed the following week. The government proclaimed a state of emergency, and called for an immediate evacuation of all Ambae residents to Maewo Island.

Ceremonial offerings
To "quieten the fire of Lake Voui", a highly valued animal (pig) was slaughtered, and food, meats and mats were released into the waters from the shores of Lake Voui as an offering to Kelevu, the custodian of the lake, during a lakeside custom ceremony around 20 September 2017, conducted by delegation of high-ranking Ambaen custom chiefs and led by North Ambae Paramount Chief Tari One of Ambanga Village.

Lakes 
There are three warm freshwater crater lakes on the volcano, near its peak: Manaro Ngoru, Vui (Voui) and Manaro Lakua.  Vui, the inner crater, alone contains 50 million cubic metres of water.

References

External links 
 Volcano live (Mountains of Vanuatu)
 

Shield volcanoes of Vanuatu
One-thousanders of the Pacific Islands
Mountains of Vanuatu
Penama Province
2018 natural disasters
Active volcanoes